Kalu (also Romanized as Kalū) is a village in Roshanabad Rural District, in the Central District of Gorgan County, Golestan Province, Iran. At the 2006 census, its population was at 394.

References 

Populated places in Gorgan County